

France
 Porto-Novo – 
 Marius Daumas, Agent (1863–1865)
 Porto-Novo no longer a protectorate

Portugal
 Angola – 
 José Baptista de Andrade, Governor-General of Angola (1862–1865)
 Francisco Antonio Gonçalves Cardoso, Governor-General of Angola (1865–1868)

United Kingdom
Malta Colony – Henry Knight Storks, Governor of Malta (1864–1867)
New South Wales – John Young, Baron Lisgar, Governor of New South Wales (1861–1867)
 Queensland – Sir George Bowen, Governor of Queensland (1859–1868)
 Tasmania – Colonel Thomas Browne, Governor of Tasmania (1862–1868)
 South Australia – Sir Dominick Daly, Governor of South Australia (1862–1868)
 Victoria – Sir Charles Darling, Governor of Victoria (1863–1866)
 Western Australia – John Hampton, Governor of Western Australia (1862–1868)

Colonial governors
Colonial governors
1865